John Fitzgerald and Anders Järryd were the defending champions, but lost in the semifinals this year.

Todd Woodbridge and Mark Woodforde successfully defended their title, defeating Steve DeVries and David Macpherson 6–3, 6–4 in the final.

Seeds
All seeds receive a bye into the second round.

Draw

Finals

Top half

Bottom half

References
Draw

1992 Stockholm Open
1992 ATP Tour